Biashush (also Romanized as Bīāshūsh and Beyā Shūsh) is a village in Palanganeh Rural District, in the Central District of Javanrud County, Kermanshah Province, Iran. At the 2006 census, its population was 748, in 163 families.

References 

Populated places in Javanrud County